A Woman of the Iron People is an anthropological science fiction novel by American writer Eleanor Arnason, originally published in 1991.  It is a first contact story between peoples from a future Earth and an intelligent, furred race of people who live on an unnamed planet far from Earth.

Along with White Queen, A Woman of the Iron People won the inaugural Otherwise Award in 1991. The later paperback edition consisted of two separate volumes, In the Light of Sigma Draconis and Changing Women, split at the natural dividing point of the novel.

Plot
A Woman of the Iron people is divided into two parts.  The first primarily deals with Lixia's growing understanding and involvement with life on the planet.  Soon after arriving on the planet she meets Nia and starts to pick up the language of gifts, which is a sort of trade language, from her.  They leave their current location and journey west, meeting Derek and the Voice of the Waterfall along the way.

The second part of the novel deals primarily with the question of intervention.  The various factions of humans, most of whom are still in space, disagree as to how much the humans should intervene on the planet.  Questions are raised about the policy of intervention.

Characters
Nia is the eponymous woman of the Iron People and a native of the alien planet.
Li Lixia is a human from the expeditionary force to the planet; the bulk of the novel is written from her viewpoint.
Derek is another human from the expeditionary force.  He joins up with Nia and Lixia early on.
The Voice of the Waterfall is a male of the same species as Nia.  He joins Nia and Lixia when the spirit of his waterfall tells him to follow.

Sources
 Arnason, Eleanor.  A Woman of the Iron People.  1991: William and Morrow Company, Inc.  New York.
 
 "Precious Metals: Eleanor Arnason's  A Woman of the Iron People" by John Garrison, March 29, 2004, Strange Horizons

External links
2012 Review by  Jo Walton, including this little poem:
If there is a space ship
A story is therefore science fiction.
Unless it also contains the holy grail,
The presence of a space ship is sufficient
For everyone to acknowledge a story as science fiction.
Aiya, this is not very difficult, people!

1991 American novels
1991 science fiction novels
American science fiction novels
James Tiptree Jr. Award-winning works
Novels by Eleanor Arnason
Novels set on fictional planets
William Morrow and Company books